Craig S. Keener (born 4 July 1960) is a North American academic, Charismatic Baptist pastor, theologian, Biblical scholar and professor of New Testament at Asbury Theological Seminary.

Biography
Keener was born on 4 July 1960.

Education
In 1982, Keener got his B.A. from the Central Bible College (now part of Evangel University). He got his M.A. in 1982 and M.Div. in 1987 at the Assemblies of God Theological Seminary (now of Evangel University). In 1991, he received his Ph.D. in New Testament Studies and Christian Origins from Duke University.

Career
Keener was associate pastor of Enon Tabernacle Baptist Church of Philadelphia until 2011.  

Keener became a professor at Hood Theological Seminary, then professor of New Testament at Palmer Theological Seminary at Eastern University for nearly 15 years. Since 2011, Keener has been (F. M. and Ada Thompson) professor of New Testament at Asbury Theological Seminary in Wilmore, Kentucky. Keener has taught in various countries, especially countries in Africa.

From 2014 to 2019, Keener was the editor of the Bulletin for Biblical Research. He has authored a number of commentaries on New Testament books as well as books and articles. His popular IVP Bible Background Commentary: New Testament (1993) has sold over half a million copies. 

In 2020, he served as the president of the Evangelical Theological Society.

Scholarly expertise and views 
Keener's expertise lies in New Testament Background, the book of Acts, Jesus, Miracles, the Gospels and Ethnic/racial Reconciliation. 

Bruce Chilton lauded Keener's 2009 book The Historical Jesus of the Gospels, writing that it "marks a notable moment in the critical study of Jesus." He based this claim on the fact that Keener uses the study of Jesus' Jewish environment to argue for the authenticity of the Gospels. Keener has an Arminian theological standpoint on soteriology, supporting conditional preservation of the believer. Keener holds egalitarian views.

Awards
The NIV Cultural Backgrounds Study Bible, for which Keener authored most of the New Testament notes, won Bible of the Year in the 2017 Christian Book Awards, and also won Book of the Year in the Religion: Christianity category of the International Book Awards.

Personal life
He is married to Médine Moussounga Keener, who holds a Ph.D. from University of Paris 7. He and his wife have two children, David and Keren.

Works

Books

 - based on the author's Ph.D. thesis

Articles and chapters
(n.b. partial list)

Notes and references

Citations

Sources

External links
 Keener's Personal Home page
 Official site for Keener's Bible background research (Mostly popular-level, including Bible studies)

1960 births
Academic journal editors
American biblical scholars
American Christian theologians
Arminian ministers
Arminian theologians
Asbury Theological Seminary faculty
Assemblies of God Theological Seminary alumni
Baptist ministers from the United States
Bible commentators
Central Bible College alumni
Duke University alumni
Living people
New Testament scholars
Palmer Theological Seminary